Elk Horn Township is an inactive township in McDonald County, in the U.S. state of Missouri.

Elk Horn Township takes its name from Elkhorn Creek.

References

Townships in Missouri
Townships in McDonald County, Missouri